A line group is a mathematical way of describing symmetries associated with moving along a line. These symmetries include repeating along that line, making that line a one-dimensional lattice. However, line groups may have more than one dimension, and they may involve those dimensions in its isometries or symmetry transformations.

One constructs a line group by taking a point group in the full dimensions of the space, and then adding translations or offsets along the line to each of the point group's elements, in the fashion of constructing a space group. These offsets include the repeats, and a fraction of the repeat, one fraction for each element. For convenience, the fractions are scaled to the size of the repeat; they are thus within the line's unit cell segment.

One-dimensional 

There are 2 one-dimensional line groups. They are the infinite limits of the discrete two-dimensional point groups Cn and Dn:

Two-dimensional 

There are 7 frieze groups, which involve reflections along the line, reflections perpendicular to the line, and 180° rotations in the two dimensions.

Three-dimensional 

There are 13 infinite families of three-dimensional line groups, derived from the 7 infinite families of axial three-dimensional point groups. As with space groups in general, line groups with the same point group can have different patterns of offsets. Each of the families is based on a group of rotations around the axis with order n. The groups are listed in Hermann-Mauguin notation, and for the point groups, Schönflies notation. There appears to be no comparable notation for the line groups. These groups can also be interpreted as patterns of wallpaper groups wrapped around a cylinder n times and infinitely repeating along the cylinder's axis, much like the three-dimensional point groups and the frieze groups. A table of these groups:

The offset types are:
 None. Offsets along the axis include no offsets around it to within repeats of the unit cell around the axis.
 Helical offset with helicity q. For a unit offset along the axis, there is an offset of q around it. A point that has repeated offsets will trace out a helix.
 Zigzag offset. Helical offset of 1/2 relative to the unit cell around the axis.

Note that the wallpaper groups pm, pg, cm, and pmg appear twice. Each appearance has a different orientation relative to the line-group axis; reflection parallel (h) or perpendicular (v). The other groups have no such orientation: p1, p2, pmm, pgg, cmm.

If the point group is constrained to be a crystallographic point group, a symmetry of some three-dimensional lattice, then the resulting line group is called a rod group. There are 75 rod groups.

 The Coxeter notation is based on the rectangular wallpaper groups, with the vertical axis wrapped into a cylinder of symmetry order n or 2n.

Going to the continuum limit, with n to ∞, the possible point groups become C∞, C∞h, C∞v, D∞, and D∞h, and the line groups have the appropriate possible offsets, with the exception of zigzag.

Helical symmetry 

The groups Cn(q) and Dn(q) express the symmetries of helical objects. Cn(q) is for n helices oriented in the same direction, while Dn(q) is for n unoriented helices and 2n helices with alternating orientations. Reversing the sign of q creates a mirror image, reversing the helices' chirality or handedness.

Nucleic acids, DNA and RNA, are well known for their helical symmetry. Nucleic acids have a well-defined direction, giving single strands C1(q). Double strands have opposite directions and are on opposite sides of the helix axis, giving them D1(q).

See also 

 Point group
 Space group
 One-dimensional symmetry group
 Frieze group
 Rod group

References 

Euclidean symmetries
Discrete groups